Bordertown Trail is a 1944 American Western film directed by Lesley Selander and written by Robert Creighton Williams and Jesse Duffy. The film stars Smiley Burnette, Sunset Carson, Weldon Heyburn, Addison Richards, Francis McDonald and Jack Luden. The film was released on August 11, 1944, by Republic Pictures.

Plot

Cast  
Smiley Burnette as Frog Millhouse
Sunset Carson as Sunset Carson
Weldon Heyburn as New Orleans
Addison Richards as Fontaine
Francis McDonald as Matthews
Jack Luden as Lieutenant Victor Carson 
Ellen Lowe as Abigail
Rex Lease as Sergeant Jenkins
John James as Tom
Jack Kirk as Henchman Hank
Henry Wills as Henchman
Cliff Parkinson as Henchman

See also
List of American films of 1944

References

External links 
 

1944 films
1940s English-language films
American Western (genre) films
1944 Western (genre) films
Republic Pictures films
Films directed by Lesley Selander
American black-and-white films
1940s American films